The Frontier Trail is a lost 1926 American silent Western film directed by Scott R. Dunlap and starring Harry Carey.

Plot

Cast
 Harry Carey - Jim Cardigan
 Mabel Julienne Scott - Dolly Mainard
 Ernest Hilliard - Captain Blackwell
 Frank Campeau - Shad Donlin
 Nelson McDowell - Pawnee Jake
 Charles Hill Mailes - Major Mainard (as Charles Mailes)
 Harvey Clark - Sergeant O'Shea
 Aggie Herring - Mrs. O'Shea
 Chief John Big Tree - Chief Gray Wolf

See also
 Harry Carey filmography

References

External links
 
 

1926 films
1926 Western (genre) films
1926 lost films
American black-and-white films
Films directed by Scott R. Dunlap
Lost Western (genre) films
Lost American films
Pathé Exchange films
Silent American Western (genre) films
1920s American films
Films with screenplays by Richard Schayer